Trofors is the administrative centre of the municipality of Grane in Nordland county, Norway. It is located at the confluence of the rivers Austervefsna and Svenningdalselva which forms the large river Vefsna.

Trofors lies along the European route E6 highway, at the intersection with Norwegian National Road 73 which heads east to Hattfjelldal and then to Sweden. The Nordland Line runs through the western part of the village, stopping at Trofors Station.

References 

Villages in Nordland
Grane, Nordland